William Hodgson (9 July 1935 – 2022) was a Scottish footballer who played as a winger or inside forward.

Career
Born in Glasgow, Scotland, Hodgson started his career with Dunoon Athletic before joining St Johnstone in 1954. He had a loan at Guildford City in 1956. After making 61 appearances and scoring 20 goals in the Scottish Football League, he joined Sheffield United in May 1957.  At York, he also served as assistant and player coach under Joe Shaw. 

His death was reported by Leicester City, another of his former clubs, in August 2022.

References

1935 births
2022 deaths
Footballers from Glasgow
Scottish footballers
Association football wingers
Association football forwards
Association football utility players
Scottish Football League players
English Football League players
St Johnstone F.C. players
Guildford City F.C. players
Sheffield United F.C. players
Leicester City F.C. players
Derby County F.C. players
Rotherham United F.C. players
York City F.C. players
Hamilton Academical F.C. players
Scottish football managers
York City F.C. non-playing staff